Randolph Technical High School is a Philadelphia public high school that is named in honor of A. Philip Randolph, a union and civil rights leader, and is run by the Philadelphia School District.

Academics

English

Ninth grade
English 1- Topics include business and friendly letter writing; literary terms; creative writing- short stories, plays and poetry; figurative language and poetry; library and study skills; research and writing in the computer lab, including use of the Internet.

Tenth grade
English 2 - a course designed to continue the 9th grade curriculum, including narrative writing, introduction to Shakespeare, newspaper study- news articles, features, editorials, creation of newsletters, vocabulary development including synonyms and antonyms; research and writing in the computer lab, including use of the Internet.

Eleventh grade
English 3 - A course continuing the 10th grade curriculum, and including an introduction to research via a short major paper; how to write letters to colleges; pervasive writing; vocabulary development including analogies; research and writing in the computer lab, including use of the Internet.

Twelfth grade
English 4- A course teaching the 11th grade curriculum, and in addition includes a major research paper including extensive use of the Internet as a research tool.

History

Social Science
The course is divided into two parts.  The first half of the year is devoted to the  study of US Government and the Constitution. Students learn what it means to  be a useful and sharing member of society, knowledge of the rights and  responsibilities of citizenship, and an appreciation of freedom. In  the second half  of the school year students study economics. Students studies economic systems,  supply and demand, monetary and fiscal policy, the role of the consumer, labor,  business and government in the economy.

American History
Examining American History from the Revolutionary period through to the present. The goal of the course is to have students appreciate the historical struggle and accomplishments of the American people in building a democratic society.

World History
A survey course in which students investigate the accomplishments of ancient and classical civilizations, the Middle Ages, renaissance, and the modern industrial age.

Street Law
Street law is an 11th grade elective course. The objective of this course is to provide practical information and problem solving opportunities that develop knowledge and skills required in society. Subject matter includes current law related public issues (gangs, guns) and alternative forms of conflict resolution.

Mathematics

Ninth grade
Algebra 1 - topics range from order of operations, expressions, with variables, distributive properties, combining like terms, addition, subtraction, multiplication and division of integers, evaluate algebraic expressions, solving equations, word problem solving, inequalities, polynomials, factoring, quadratics equations and graphing.

Tenth grade
Geometry- a course designed to study geometric figures in a plane. This would include lines, angles and polygons, circles and arcs, area and perimeter, congruent and similar figures, and the Pythagorean Theorem.

Eleventh grade
Algebra 2- a course designed to introduce students to real numbers, equations, inequalities, polynomials, factoring, rational expressions, irrational and complex numbers, quadratics, matrices and determinants.

Twelfth grade
Elementary Functions- a study of the elementary functions (power functions, polynomials, rational, exponential, logarithmic and trigonometric) with an emphasis on their behavior and applications. Some analytic geometry and elements of the calculus as well as the application of matrices to the solution of linear systems is also included.

Science

Ninth grade
Active Physics- an introductory physics course that studies matter and energy. Basic principles of physics are explained. An understanding of physical laws and their relationship to everyday events will be stressed.

Tenth and eleventh grades
Biology - (10th and 11th) - develops an understanding of living things. Topics include the chemistry of life, cell structure and genetics, thermal, and behavior of fluids.

Chemistry - (11th) - a course that teaches the composition and structure of matter.

Twelfth grade
Environmental Science- a course teaching environmental concepts and how they affect the sustainability of ecosystems.  Using laboratory lessons, students will understand how man and his environment interact in the biosphere.
Physics- a conceptual and problem solving course designed to teach the basic relationships between matter and energy. Through the use of laboratory experiences, students will come to learn and understand the physical laws that govern the universe.

Shops

Carpentry
The student learns the construction and repair of buildings and is educated to enter the construction industry. The student will be able to read specifications and architectural drawings, follow building codes, and use hand and power tools in construction projects.
Graduates often work with small independent contractors.

Electrical shop
The student learns the theory and laws of electricity; get hands-on experience in construction and maintenance; learns industrial, commercial, and residential wiring in accordance with national and local codes; installs, tests, and repairs appliances.
Graduates are qualified for entry level jobs in electrical construction.

Auto body shop
The student repairs body parts with sanding and body tools; welds and cuts; and paints vehicles. Training often leads to employment in garages and shops in the city.

Auto mechanics
The student repairs and overhauls automobiles; works on suspension systems, drive and power train systems, engine, exhaust systems and cooling systems, and plans work procedures using automobile parts and manuals.

Health and related technology
The Health and Related Technology program prepares the student for a future in the medical health professions. The program has academic college bound subjects. In addition, medically related courses are given to prepare the students for careers in the health care field such as: physician, nurse, medical laboratory technologist, radiographer, physical therapist, etc. To promote professionalism and career opportunities, senior students spend three months at area hospitals assisting the medical staff in the program. Computer skills are also introduced.

Fire academy
Students learn about safety, all types of fires. They try on fire equipment, and go to the Philadelphia Fire Department Fire Academy. Graduates receive a certificate certifying them as Emergency Medical Technicians and a Fire Fighter.

Student activities

Sports
The sports that are active at Randolph are baseball, football (which is shared with Dobbins), and basketball.

Student government
Randolph Student Government Association is an organization that provides social and community activities for the student body during the school year. The officers and student representatives from each homeroom spend time learning about governmental practices and responsibilities. The members of the Student Government meet with the principal once a month to discuss school matters and student concerns.

Students are encouraged to participate in school activities by awarding honor points for all grades, attendance, activities, club memberships, and sport teams. Honor points are accumulated over the four year high school period. During an awards assembly held in June, students are given certificates, pins, trophies, and medals based on the number of honor points they have. Seniors look forward to wearing these medals at graduation.

Legacy
The Legacy Program is a non-profit organization sponsored by Delaware Valley College through a United States federal grant: TRJO. Legacy provides workshops, tutorials, field trips and individual counseling to students designed to address the following: academic enrichment; college/career preparation; ethnic identity and cultural diversity; and leadership development. 

Legacy has provided workshops, lectures and trips to over 500 students since its inception at Dobbins/Randolph Area Vocational Technical School in 1994. Trips have included visits to local colleges and universities and New York television shows.

References

External links
Official website

High schools in Philadelphia
Public high schools in Pennsylvania
Upper North Philadelphia